Kliclo is an artist based in Paris, France. Her works deal with traces, remains and memories, often using Yiddish.

Biography 
Her works have been exhibited in Norway, Belgium, Switzerland, Germany, Israel and extensively in France, especially in Paris.
Kliclo is known for her work in installation art, painting and etching. Her leitmotifs include Films, Pavements and Walls, non functioning Clocks and burnt or disintegrated Letters (message) and books. Some of her works incorporate text in Yiddish.

Selected solo exhibitions 

 2018 : De 18 à 18... La roue tourne - Mairie du 13ème arrondissement de Paris 
 2017 : Balades en roues libres, Espace Saint-Jean, Melun
 2017 : Galerie Marie-Laure de l'Ecotais - Paris 6ème
 2012 : Mon Atlantide, Salle Lucie Aubrac, de Montmorency, Val-d'Oise
 2010 : L'Apostrophe Scène nationale, Cergy-Pontoise et Val-d'Oise
 2008 : Galerie am Storchenturm - Berlin
 2003 : Cercle Bernard Lazare Paris, Centre culturel
 2002 : Centre Culturel Rachi Paris - Rétrospective

Selected group exhibitions 
 2016 : La Biennale d'art contemporain de Cachan 2016
 2006 : Koï Nobori Centre Culturel Japonais Paris XIème
 1996 : X artistes du Xème, Mairie du 10ème arrondissement de Paris
 1992 : Seville Expo '92, Sevilla, Pavillon de France

Selected installations 
 2016 : Cinémathèque de Tel-Aviv - Installation Films
 2015 : L'écume des pages - Paris 6ème - Installation Films
 2013 : Les Partitions de vent, Espace "9Cube", la mairie du 9ème arrondissement de Paris
 2008 & 2013 : Colloques Actuel de la Shoah, École normale supérieure, Paris
 2006 : Institut universitaire de formation des maîtres (IUFM), Paris
 1995 : Festival du film de Genève - Performance : réalisation et installation d’un "film" sur toile

Collections 
 Bibliothèque nationale de France
 Yad Vashem
 Editions Filipacchi, Paris
 L'Apostrophe Public Theater, Cergy-Pontoise

Awards 
 2004 – Laureate of the Prix Les Voies de la Réussite

References

External links 
 
 
 
 Exhibition review about Balades en roues libres by Jonathan Siksou, Causeur online magazine 

Living people
21st-century French women artists
Jewish women artists
Year of birth missing (living people)
French installation artists
French women painters
20th-century French women